African feminism is a type of feminism innovated by African women that specifically addresses the conditions and needs of continental African women (African women who reside on the African continent). African feminism includes many strains of its own, including Motherism, Femalism, Snail-sense Feminism, Womanism/women palavering, Nego-feminism,  and African Womanism. Because Africa is not a monolith, these feminisms are not all reflective of the experiences African women have. Some of the feminisms are more specific to certain groups of African women. African feminism is sometimes aligned with, in dialogue or in conflict with, Black Feminism  or African womanism (which is perceived as by and for African women in the diaspora, rather than African women on or recently from the continent) as well as other feminisms and feminist movements, including nationally based ones, such as feminism in Sweden, feminism in India, feminism in Mexico, feminism in Japan, feminism in Germany, feminism in South Africa, and so on.

Need for African feminism 
Some argue that African women are the first feminists, were already deeply engaged at the World Conference on Women, 1985 and have long been recognizing each other's contributions. Others feel African feminism became necessary in part due to white Western feminism's exclusion of the experiences of the black woman and the continental African woman. White Western feminisms does not take into account the particular issues black women face at the intersection of both their blackness and their womanhood. Currently, white feminism often classifies African women as "women of color," which groups and thereby represses the African woman's historical trajectory and specific experience. Hazel Carby in "White Women Listen! Black Feminism and the Boundaries of Sisterhood" notes why white feminism is considered the normative experience of all women. She writes, "History has constructed our sexuality and our femininity as deviating from those qualities with which white women, as the prize of the Western world, have been endowed." However, white feminism cannot continue to erase Africa or African women from feminist theory or feminist advocacy, because as the Mother Continent of humanity, the narratives and experiences of Africa's women will always be relevant.

African feminism was not wholly a reaction to being excluded from white feminists' vision of feminism, but also from their own ingenuity and desire to create a feminism that embraced their backgrounds and experiences. African feminism voices the realities of women in varying African countries. Women's needs, reality, oppression and empowerment are best addressed by having an inclusive and accommodating understanding of the generic and more general issues as well as the peculiarities and group attitude to self-definition as women. Naomi Nkealah writes that African feminism "strives to create a new, liberal, productive and self-reliant African woman within the heterogeneous cultures of Africa. Feminisms in Africa, ultimately, aim at modifying culture as it affects women in different societies."

At the same time, Africa is not a monolith and so some have critiqued any idea of "African feminism." There exist differences regionally, ethnically, politically, and in religion, which all work to impact how women conceptualize what feminism and freedom looks like for them. While African women from, for example, Egypt, Kenya, South Africa and Senegal will have some commonalities, there will be variations in the way they understand gender and gender struggles. Therefore, these varying cultures alter the way these African women experience the world. Thus, one cannot simply merge all woman under an unrealistic expectation of sisterhood, but instead to recognize and respect the differences that exist as a result of these diversities. There is a commonality to the struggles women face across the world since the common factor is male privilege. The modern African woman is strong, smart, and resilient and has woken up to the options she has. She is no longer satisfied with the options created for her, but seeks to create new options and choices for the generation of other African women that will come after her. Ghanaian feminists, for example, contribute to this by using social media to change the public discourse around feminism.

Colonial roots of gender inequality in Africa suggests that slavery and colonialism were the origin of inequality amongst men and women in Africa. In the pre-colonial area, women held positions of prominence, contributing to society socially and economically in a patrilineal society by managing the younger family members and being involved with international trade. According to Ada Uzoamaka Azodo, "There existed a complementarity of male and female roles in precolonial African societies and that it is during and after colonization that the downfall of the African woman from a position of power and self-sovereignty to becoming man's helper occurred." In Edo and Yoruba cultures, Queen-mothers were a title a king's mother or a free woman with notable status would receive. They would officiate meetings and have subordinate title-holders assisting her. Yoruba and Hausa legends claim that women were even able to hold the title of king. However, this changed in the 20th century with patriarchy and colonialism changing the position of women in society. Female chiefs lost their power as male chiefs began to negotiate with colonial powers. Western ideas about patriarchy that promoted the female dependency on men were superimposed on colonized communities' educational, political, and economic sectors in Africa.

Some scholars have called for more attention in African feminist theory to sex work, the white savior complex and violence against African women, women in the military, fieldwork with African women, same-sex intimacies, contemporaneity, and activists' thought.

African feminism has been divided around issues of sexuality: "African feminists are sharply divided, with the bulk of the majority resistant to challenging heterosexism and homophobia in their praxis against patriarchy. ... Only a few radical African feminists address heteronormativity, while a much smaller corpus of individual queer African feminists incorporates non-essentialist fluid and dynamic understandings of gender that digress the fixed binary opposition of men and women, male and female."

Principles of African feminism 
African feminisms address cultural issues that they feel pertain to the complex experiences faced by all women of all cultures on the African continent. In regards to feminist theorizing, many of the authors of such theories originate from West Africa and Nigeria in particular.[1]

In her article, "West African Feminisms and Their Challenges", Naomi Nkealah discusses the various forms of African feminisms. First, she points to womanism, which she argues is not part of African feminism, as it pertains to African women of the diaspora and not continental African women. Second, she looks at stiwanism, which, on the contrary, places African women at the center of the discourse because stiwanism is deeply rooted in the experiences and realities African women face. Third, she looks at Motherism, a maternal form of feminism that sees rural women as performing the necessary task of nurturing society. Fourth, she looks at femalism, which puts the woman's body at the center of feminist conversations. Finally, she looks at nego-feminism and snail-sense feminism, which urge the inclusion of men in discussions and advocacy for feminism and both argue that the inclusion of men is necessary to the freedom of women.

These modes of feminisms share several commonalities. First, they all challenge the term "feminism," both its Western term and roots, because they bring to the forefront the experiences of the African woman. Second, because they are dependent on indigenous blueprints, they take from the histories and cultures of African peoples in order to create the necessary tools needed to embolden women and educate men. Third, they incorporate "gender inclusion, collaboration, and accommodation to ensure that both women and men contribute (even if not equally) to improving the material conditions of women."

Branches of African feminism 
The variety in feminisms displays the African woman's active engagement with gender relations.

Womanism

In her article, "West African Feminisms and Their Challenges", Naomi Nkealah states that womanism is not part of African feminism, as it pertains to African women of the diaspora and not continental African women. It resulted from critiques of liberal feminism as excluding the narratives and experiences of women of color, especially black women.

Others see womanism as emerging from both the African-American and African variants.  African Womanism addresses feminism from (1) an African perspective; (2) an African geopolitical location; (3) and an African ideological viewpoint. Womanism is important because it places the feminist vision within black women's experiences with culture, colonialism, and many other forms of domination and subjugation that impact African women's lives.  Womanism "aims at identifying the problems relating to male dominance in society while seeking solutions to women’s marginalization by looking inward and outward."

A variant of Womanism put forth by Clenora Hudson-Weems is Africana Womanism, terminology which she coined in the mid-1980s. Her use of the term "Africana" indicates that women-focused activism should be inclusive of women on the African continent and women in the African Diaspora. She argues a complete break from white feminism, a movement which was created by and for white women without any incorporation of the African experience. She also argues that Africana men and women have more in common than Africana women do with white women, further reason to develop a new kind of activism.

Stiwanism 
Founded by Omolara Ogundipe-Leslie, Stiwanism focuses more on the structures that oppress women and the way women react to these institutionalized structures. Ogundipe-Leslie argues that the struggle for African women is a result of colonial and neo-colonial structure that often place African males at the apex of social stratification. Furthermore, the struggle African women face are also impart to the way they have internalized the patriarchy and have come to endorse the system themselves.

Nego-feminism 
African feminist, writer, and scholar Obioma Nnaemeka discusses and defines the term "Nego-feminism" in her article Nego-Feminism: Theorizing, Practicing, and Pruning Africa's Way." She writes, "Nego-feminism is the feminism of negotiation; second, nego-feminism stands for 'no ego' feminism and is structured by cultural imperatives and modulated by evershifting local and global exigencies." Most African cultures have a culture of negotiation and compromise when it comes to reaching agreements. In Nego-feminism, negotiations play the role of giving and taking. For African feminism, in order to win challenges, feminists must negotiate and sometimes compromise enough in order to gain freedoms. Nnaemeka writes that African feminism works by knowing "when, where, and how to detonate and go around patriarchal land mines." This means that nego-feminism knows how to utilize the culture of negotiation in order to deconstruct the patriarchy for the woman's benefit.

Motherism 
In her book, Motherism: The Afrocentric Alternative to Feminism, Catherine Obianuju Acholonu writes that Africa's alternative to Western feminism is Motherism, and Motherism is composed of motherhood, nature, and nurture. When defined, Motherism is a multidimensional theory that involves the "dynamics of ordering, reordering, creating structures, building and rebuilding in cooperation with mother nature at all levels of human endeavor." A motherist is someone who is committed to the survival and maintenance of Mother Earth and someone who embraces the human struggle. Acholonu makes it clear, though, that a motherist can be a woman or a man. Motherism has no sex barriers because at the core of motherism is partnership, cooperation, tolerance, love, understanding, and patience.  In order for motherism to work, there must be a male-female complementarity that ensures the wholeness of human existence in a balanced ecosystem.

Femalism
The femalist model was developed by Chioma Opara. Opara describes femalism as "A hue of African feminism, is a softer tone than liberal feminism and highly polarized from radical feminism." At its core, femalism is African and it accentuates the African woman's body.

Snail-sense feminism 
Snail-sense feminism is a theory proposed by Akachi Adimora-Ezeigbo. This feminism encourages Nigerian woman to work slowly like a snail's movement in her dealings with men in the "tough and very difficult patriarchal [Nigerian] society they live in." Ezeigbo proposes that women "must learn survival strategies to be able to overcome the impediments placed before her and live a good life."

Misovirism feminism 
Misovirism is a theory Invented by Cameroonian thinker Werewere Liking.

Cultural feminism 
Cultural feminism is a theory invented by Nigerian author Buchi Emecheta, which she called "feminism with a small f."

Examples of African feminism

Nigerian feminist movements 
Although noteworthy feminist movements have sprouted across the African continent, the feminist movement in Nigeria serves as a prime example of African feminism. Following the 1982 national conference, the inauguration of the organization Women in Nigeria (WIN) presented feminism in its present form - consistent, organized, with clear objectives and ideology. In spite of rough beginnings, many scholars pay tribute to WIN for acting as training grounds for the emergence of organized feminist struggles in Nigeria.

During its first ten years, WIN facilitated the development of many of the self-identified feminists in Nigeria today. WIN adopted an open membership policy of ‘come one - come all’, where anyone, male or female, was accepted as long as such a person accepted the provisions of WIN's Constitution. WIN's open membership policy allowed the entry of many persons who had no clue about the core values of feminism and principles of gender justice.

From its inception, Women in Nigeria sponsored research projects while engaging in policy advocacy and activism that holistically aimed towards enhancing the socio-economic conditions under which many women in Nigeria experienced. Furthermore, the uniqueness of WIN derives from its consciousness of both class and gender in relation to the struggle for the emancipation of Nigerian women. Therefore, WIN recognized the Nigerian female experience as essentially as “double jeopardy,” where exploitation and oppression of women marked as dual forms of injustices, both as members of the subordinate class and as women.

In January 2008, the Nigerian feminist movement inaugurated the Nigerian Feminist Forum (NFF) - which established a larger and more coherent coalition than WIN. In the early 2000s, the NFF was created after an incubation period that started with the launching of the African Feminist Forum (AFF) in Accra, Ghana. The AFF published the Charter of the Feminist Principles which serves as an informative guide for African Feminists that clearly states how African feminists define themselves, it delivers the understanding of Feminism and Patriarchy, and amplifies the identity, ethics and proper knowledge of feminist leadership across the continent of Africa.

After much success at the grassroots level, the NFF effectively expanded and replaced Women in Nigeria (WIN) as the official Nigerian Feminist Movement. Furthermore, these newly evolved Nigerian feminist movements took part of the continental (Pan African) feminist movement, where thousands of feminist activists from all over the region were brought together to fight against the Patriarchy.

Prominent African feminists 
Well-known African feminists include Frances Abigail Olufunmilayo Ransome-Kuti, Lady Kofoworola Aina Ademola, Chimamanda Ngozi Adichie, Mona Eltahawy, Nawal El Saadawi, Maria Sarungi, Fatma Karume, Meaza Ashenafi, Zara Kay, Pumla Dineo Gqola, Esther Kimani, Modupe Mary Kolawole, Oyeronke Oyewumi, Nkiru Uwachia Nzegwu, Ifi Amadiume, Chinyere Ukpokolo, Molara Leslie-Ogundipe, and Bolanle Awe.

Role of men in African feminism 
The goal of feminism is to empower women so as to ensure equality to men. For some people, the term feminism incorrectly came to mean a movement that was anti-male, anti-culture, and anti-religion. For purposes of inclusion, some women prefer to engage themselves in gender theory and activism by including men into the discussion because it promotes the idea that feminism is about equality among all genders and it is important to note that they also face hardships as males. Because the majority of policy-makers in many African countries are men, some believe that inclusivity is important if women are to gain ground in policy changes that impact them. The importance that many women place on communalism and family results in their desire to work with men to develop an inclusive approach to solving gender issues. In order to eradicate the oppression women face because of their gender, working with men has become a necessity. The role of African men in feminism is nuanced and depends on location, environment, and personal ideology.

References